Collin Ray Williams (1 November 1961 – 24 April 2022) was a Zimbabwean cricketer. He played for Matabeleland in five first-class matches and one List A match. He was also the coach of Zimbabwe field hockey team.

Personal life 
Collin Williams was married to a former Zimbabwean woman field hockey player, Patricia McKillop who was also a member of the Zimbabwean field hockey team which claimed a gold medal at the 1980 Summer Olympics. Collin's step son, Michael McKillop is a Zimbabwean field hockey player and served as the captain of the national field hockey team who also played first-class cricket for Matabeleland. His second son, Sean Williams is a cricketer who later went onto play international cricket for Zimbabwe since 2005 and his third son Matthew Williams is also a cricketer who is playing first-class cricket matches for Matabeleland Tuskers.

References

External links 
 

1961 births
2022 deaths
Zimbabwean cricketers
Matabeleland cricketers
White Zimbabwean sportspeople
Cricketers from Bulawayo